Thomas James Morstead (born March 8, 1986) is an American football punter for the New York Jets of the National Football League (NFL). He played college football at SMU and was drafted by the New Orleans Saints in the fifth round of the 2009 NFL Draft.

Early years
Morstead was born in Houston, Texas, and was raised in a nearby suburb of Pearland, Texas. He has one brother, Patrick. He attended Pearland High School and won varsity letters in football and basketball. In football, as a senior, Morstead received second-team All-District honors and was named the Brazoria County Special Teams MVP. He was also a member of the National Honor Society, adding Academic All-State honors.

College career
Morstead enrolled at Southern Methodist in 2004, turning down scholarship offers from Texas Christian, Rice, Texas and Missouri, but spent the season as a redshirt. He was a member of the Conference USA's Academic Honor Roll in 2005, but never appeared in a game. Morstead took over place-kicking and punting chores in 2006, earning All-Conference USA third-team honors. He led the league and ranked 15th in the nation in punting, averaging 43.82 yards on 50 attempts, the best average by an SMU punter since Craig James averaged 44.9 yards in 1982. He made 13 of 18 field goals and 34 of 35 extra points for a total of 73 points. He also recorded one solo tackle.

As a sophomore, Morstead was a consensus All-Conference USA first-team pick and also gained league academic honors. He again led C-USA and finished eighth nationally with a 44.65-yard average, as the Mustangs also ranked fourth in the NCAA with a 39.33-yard net average. He scored 82 points and set the league single-season record by making all 43 PAT attempts, as he also connected on 13 of 20 field goals. Morstead concentrated more on directional punting in 2008. The All-Conference USA honorable mention averaged a career-low 41.78 yards on 59 punts, but only 19 were returned, as the Mustangs placed third in the league with a 37.22-yard net average. He made 11 of 15 field goals, 29 of 30 extra points and amassed 62 points. Morstead missed three kicks inside of 40 yards in 2008, four in both 2006 and 2007.

Professional career

New Orleans Saints
Morstead was drafted in the fifth round of the 2009 NFL Draft with the 164th overall selection by the New Orleans Saints. He was the second punter chosen in 2009, after Kevin Huber (by the Cincinnati Bengals).

Morstead beat out Glenn Pakulak for the Saints' punting job in 2009. He played a critical role in the Saints' victory over the Indianapolis Colts in Super Bowl XLIV. Morstead executed an onside kick during the second half kickoff. The Saints recovered the ball and were able to convert that possession into a touchdown and a 13–10 lead. The Saints would eventually win the game 31–17. After the game, Morstead stated that while he was excited about executing the play, he was also terrified knowing that if the play was not executed perfectly, the Colts would have likely recovered the ball with a shot of extending their 10–6 lead. He currently holds the record for most kickoff touchbacks in one game (9 in a 62–7 defeat of the Indianapolis Colts on October 23, 2011) and the record for the most touchbacks in a single season (68 in 2011).

In July 2012, the Saints signed Morstead to a six-year extension stated to be worth $21.9 million, making him the second highest paid punter in the league (after Shane Lechler of the Oakland Raiders). He went on to have an outstanding season, leading the league (with a record-setting pace through 15 games) in net punting yardage, and was elected to the Pro Bowl.

Before the 2014 season, Morstead was selected as the Saints' special teams captain, and he retained the title in 2015.

In the NFC Divisional matchup versus the Minnesota Vikings, Morstead tore cartilage in his rib cage after making a tackle in the first quarter but remained in the game. Nevertheless, he was visibly hurt as he punted throughout the game. The Vikings scored the winning touchdown in the closing seconds of the game, and both sides assumed that the contest was over with Saints players headed for the locker room, however Morstead was the first player to return to the field for the extra point attempt. Vikings' fans were impressed by the toughness and sportsmanship Morstead displayed in the eventual defeat, so a Vikings-dedicated Reddit group donated more than $140,000 to his charity in less than 24 hours, and Morstead presented the donations to the Children's Hospital of Minnesota.

On March 16, 2018, Morstead signed a five-year contract extension with the Saints.

In Week 3 of the 2019 season, Morstead downed four of his six punts inside the 20-yard line in a 33–27 win over the Seahawks, earning him NFC Special Teams Player of the Week. In Week 6, Morstead pinned five of his six punts inside the 20-yard line with a long of 51 yards in a 13–6 win over the Jaguars, earning him his second NFC Special Teams Player of the Week honors of 2019. He was also named NFC Special Teams Player of the Month for September.

In Week 1 of the 2020 season against the Tampa Bay Buccaneers, Morstead had five punts inside the 20 yard line during the 34–23 win. He was named the NFC Special Teams Player of the Week for his performance.

On March 4, 2021, the Saints released Morstead after 12 seasons.

New York Jets
On September 14, 2021, Morstead signed with the New York Jets to fill in for the injured Braden Mann. He was released on November 8.

Atlanta Falcons
On November 23, 2021, Morstead signed with the Atlanta Falcons.

In his Falcons debut in Week 12, Morstead downed three of his five punts inside the 20 yard line in the 21–14 win over the Jacksonville Jaguars, earning NFC Special Teams Player of the Week. He was also later named NFC Special Teams Player of the Month for December.

Miami Dolphins
On April 8, 2022, Morstead signed with the Miami Dolphins. In a week 3 game against the Buffalo Bills, Morstead inadvertently kicked a punt in the endzone into the buttocks of fellow Dolphin Trent Sherfield, resulting in a safety. The play went viral, becoming known as the "Butt Punt".

New York Jets 
On March 17, 2023, Morstead announced that he was signing with the New York Jets.

NFL career statistics

Regular season

Postseason

Personal life
Morstead and his wife, Lauren, have four children. Morstead is a Christian.

In 2014, Morstead and his wife, Lauren, created the charity What You Give Will Grow. To date, the organization has given over $2,500,000 to various causes.

Morstead co-wrote a book with Sean Jensen named "The Middle School Rules of Thomas Morstead."

References

External links
 SMU profile

1986 births
Living people
American football punters
Atlanta Falcons players
New Orleans Saints players
New York Jets players
People from Pearland, Texas
Players of American football from Texas
SMU Mustangs football players
Sportspeople from Harris County, Texas
Pearland High School alumni
National Conference Pro Bowl players
Miami Dolphins players